Marc Recha (born 18 October 1970) is a Catalan Spanish film director and screenwriter. He has directed 18 films (9 shorts and 9 feature films) since 1988. He mostly films his films in Catalan Language but also in French and Spanish. His film Pau i el seu germà was entered into the 2001 Cannes Film Festival.

Filmography

Full-length Films 
 1991 - El cielo sube (Heaven Rises)
 1998 - L'arbre de les cireres (The Cherry Tree)
 2001 - Pau i el seu germà (Pau and His Brother)
 2003 - Les mains vides / Les mans buides (Where is Madame Catherine?, or Empty-Handed)
 2006 - Dies d'agost (August Days)
 2009 - Petit indi ('Petit indi' - the director does not translate it, though literally, it's "Little Indian")
 2014 - Bridges of Sarajevo (Recha participates in this documentary anthology film together with 12 other directors)
 2015 - Un dia perfecte per volar (A Perfect Day for Flying)
 2017 - La vida lliure (Free life)

Shorts 
 1988 - El darrer instant (The Last Instant)
 1990 - El zelador (The Guard)
 1990 - La por d'abocar-se (The Fear of Falling)
 1990 - Tout à la française (Everything French-Style)
 1992 - La maglana
 1994 - És tard (It's Late)
 1998 - L'escampavies (The Coast Guard)
 2001 - Sobre el pas de dues persones uns quants anys més tard (On the Passage of Two People Several Years Later)
 2007 - Coses vistes (Things Seen)

References

External links

 Parallamps, Recha's production company, with info about his films (in Catalan, Spanish, French and English)

1970 births
Living people
Film directors from Catalonia
Spanish male screenwriters
People from Barcelona
21st-century Spanish screenwriters